Admiral Badger may refer to:

Oscar Charles Badger II (1890–1958), admiral of the U.S. Navy
Charles Johnston Badger (1853–1932), admiral of the U.S. Navy